The 1995 European Karate Championships, the 30th edition, was held  in Helsinki, Finland from May 21 to 23, 1995.

Competition

Team

Women's competition

Individual

Team

Medal table

References

External links
 Karate Records - European Championship 1995

1995
International sports competitions hosted by Finland
European Karate Championships
European championships in 1995
International sports competitions in Helsinki
1990s in Helsinki
Karate competitions in Finland
May 1995 sports events in Europe